Carolina Toll (born 1973) is a Norwegian sailor. She was born in Gothenburg, and represented the Royal Norwegian Yacht Club. She competed at the 2000 Summer Olympics in Sydney, where she placed 16th in the Women's 470 competition, together with Jeanette Lunde.

References

External links

Norwegian female sailors (sport)
1973 births
Living people
People from Gothenburg
Sailors at the 2000 Summer Olympics – 470
Olympic sailors of Norway